Main & Oak is a former Rochester Industrial and Rapid Transit Railway station located in Rochester, New York. The line was near a connection to the Baltimore and Ohio Railroad and the Oak Street Loop. It was closed in 1956 along with the rest of the line.

The Broad Street Tunnel Project rehabilitated some sections and the subway tunnel where this station had been located, between Main Street and Brown Street, was filled in. The new west portal to the tunnel is just west of this station along Broad Street.

References

Railway stations in Rochester, New York
Railway stations in the United States opened in 1918
Railway stations closed in 1956
1918 establishments in New York (state)
1956 disestablishments in New York (state)
Railway stations located underground in New York (state)